Randburg is an area located in the Gauteng province of South Africa. Formerly a separate municipality, its administration devolved to the newly created City of Johannesburg Metropolitan Municipality, along with neighbouring Sandton and Roodepoort, in the late 1990s. During the transitional period of 1996–2000, Randburg was part of the Northern Metropolitan Local Council (MLC).

History 

Randburg was founded as a town in 1959, as the amalgamation of 32 suburbs, northwest of Johannesburg. Although economically linked to Johannesburg, residents chose to create their own town council. The name Randburg was chosen in a competition, and is derived from the South African Rand currency, which was introduced at around the same time that the new municipality was established in 1959. Like other affluent northern suburbs of Johannesburg, the area was regarded as relatively liberal and elected Democratic Party members of parliament. As Apartheid ended, it became more supportive of F. W. de Klerk's reform-minded National Party. In 1962, it became a municipality.

The resident demographic of Randburg tends to be more affluent than most of Johannesburg. The area was declared as a white area during the Apartheid era, but post-apartheid has attracted a varied population. In 2001, it was still predominantly occupied by white English and Afrikaans suburbanites.

Suburbs
The municipal area of Randburg contains numerous suburbs; many of these are residential. Some larger areas include:
 Aldara Park
 Blairgowrie
 Bordeaux
 Boskruin
 Bromhof
 Cresta
 Darrenwood
 Fairlands
 Ferndale
 Jukskei Park
 Kensington B
 Malanshof
 Northriding
 Northwold
 Olivedale
 Randpark Ridge 
 Robindale
 Robin Hills
 Windsor East
 Windsor West

A number of Johannesburg suburbs including Parkhurst, Parkwood, Emmarentia, Linden, Northcliff, and Greenside although erroneously included by Google Maps as part of Randburg have never been part of the area.

Economy

Multichoice and its associated companies, M-Net and SuperSport, have their head offices in Randburg.

The central business district of Randburg had fallen into decay starting in the 1990s, and plans were made to revive the CBD by the Johannesburg municipality.

Strijdom Park is a well developed commercial/light industrial area in Randburg, wedged between the N1 Western Bypass and Malibongwe Drive. Strijdom park has a substantial auto sales and repair industry and has several other small industries that service the whole of northern Johannesburg.

Randburg has faced competition from Sandton which is normally the preferred location for businesses but offers lower rentals and property prices whilst providing easy transportation to the west and central Johannesburg. There are future plans to connect Randburg onto the Gautrain routes. Cresta Shopping Centre is located in Randburg.

Education
Randburg has many schools within its borders and in the nearby areas.

Colleges
 Damelin Randburg
  CTI Randburg (Robin Acres)
 Boston City Campus and Business College
 College Campus
 AAA School of Advertising
  Vega School of Brand Leadership (Bordeaux)
  Technisa - South West Gauteng College (Bordeaux)
 Global Prospectus Development Institute

High schools
Excelsior Learning Centre
 Aurora Private School
 King's School (also primary level)
 Ferndale High School
 Hoërskool Randburg (Fontainebleau)
 Linden Hoërskool
 Radley Private High School (Ferndale, also primary level)
 Trinity House School, Johannesburg (also primary level)
 Randpark High School, Randpark Ridge
  Amazing Grace Private School (also primary level)

Primary schools 
 Bordeaux Primary School
 Blairgowrie Primary School 
 I.R. Griffith Primary School (Blairgowrie)
 Laerskool Fontainebleau 
 Laerskool Louw Geldenhuys 
 Laerskool Unika
 North West Christian School 
 Rand Park Primary School 
 Risidale Primary School
 Spark schools Blairgowrie and Ferndale
 St Stithians College (Preparatory school)

Sport
Randburg Astroturf is a field hockey stadium.

Notable residents
Pastor Ray McCauley (born 1 October 1949), the founder of Rhema family church.
Gift Ngoepe (born 1990), baseball infielder

References

Johannesburg Region B